Faust: Live at Klangbad Festival is the fourth film within the "play loud! (live) music series". It features the German avant-garde pop band Faust. Filmmakers Dietmar Post and Lucia Palacios captured the group in the style of Direct Cinema at the Klangbad Festival in 2005.

Songs 

 01	Shiva
 02	Beat That
 03	Dschungelbar
 04 Don't Look Back
 05	Feuerzeuge
 06 Aggro

DVD release 
The film has been released on DVD together with the film Klangbad: Avant-garde in the Meadows.

References

External links 

Official Movie Website

2010 films
German documentary films
Spanish documentary films
American documentary films
Documentary films about pop music and musicians
Faust (band)
2010s English-language films
2010s American films
2010s German films